Kumho Asiana Group is a large South Korean Chaebol (conglomerate), with subsidiaries in the construction, leisure, and logistics industries. The group is headquartered at the Kumho Asiana Main Tower in Sinmunno 1-ga, Jongno-gu, Seoul, South Korea. As of 2014, the largest shareholder is Park Sam-koo, the third son of the company's founder, who stepped down as CEO in 2010.

History
After World War II, Park In-chon began a taxi service, based out of Geumnamno in Seo-gu, Gwangju. By the 1950s, operations had expanded to include bus and coach services, operating as Gwangju Passenger Service (today, Kumho Buslines).

The company began vertical integration in 1960 with the establishment of Samyang Tire, today Kumho Tire. Facing a shortage of raw material, Kumho Synthetic Rubber (today Kumho Petrochemical) was established in 1971. The group expanded considerably as the Korean economy boomed, adding subsidiary companies in construction, shipping and logistics, aviation, leisure, culture and entertainment, financial services, and information technology.

Surviving the 1997 Asian financial crisis in a position of strength, it acquired several companies from cash-strapped competitors in the 2000s, including Daewoo Engineering & Construction and Korea Express. These acquisitions were heavily leveraged, leading to cash flow issues as the financial crisis of 2007–08 began to impact the economy. The group was forced to sell off assets and begin a debt workout program in late 2009 after an attempt to sell Daewoo E&C failed on the open market.

In an effort to restructure, the group sold its controlling 45 percent stake in Kumho Tire to Chinese tire company Doublestar in July 2018.

In April 2019, the company sold its controlling stake in Asiana Airlines to help pay down mounting credit debt.

Subsidiaries 

 Asiana Abacus
 Kumho Art Museum
 Kumho Art Hall
 Kumho Asiana Cultural Foundation
 Kumho Electric
 Kumho Engineering and Construction
 Kumho Buslines - Reacquired from KoFC IBK Kaystone PEF in May 2015.
 Kumho Songnisan Buslines

See also 

 Economy of South Korea
 Chaebol
 List of South Korean companies

References

External links
Main
 Kumho Asiana Group Homepage (in Korean, English, and Chinese)

Group
 Asiana Abacus
 Kumho Constructions
 Kumho Asiana Cultural Foundation
 Kumho Arthall
 Kumho Art Museum
 Kumho Resort

Kumho Asiana Group
Chaebol
Conglomerate companies established in 1946
Companies of South Korea
South Korean brands
1946 establishments in Korea
Companies based in Seoul
Multinational companies headquartered in South Korea